Cleoparida is a genus of leaf beetles in the subfamily Eumolpinae. It is distributed in the Solomon Islands.

Species
 Cleoparida freycinetiae Gressitt, 1967
 Cleoparida obrieni Gressitt, 1967
 Cleoparida ribbei (Jacoby, 1898)
 Cleoparida salomonensis (Bryant, 1937)
 Cleoparida speciosa Gressitt, 1967

References

Eumolpinae
Chrysomelidae genera
Beetles of Oceania
Insects of the Solomon Islands